The Sudbury Baronetcy, of Eldon in the County of Durham, was a title in the Baronetage of England.  It was created on 25 June 1685 for John Sudbury.  The title became extinct on his death in 1691.

Sudbury baronets, of Eldon (1685)
Sir John Sudbury, 1st Baronet (died 1691)

References

Extinct baronetcies in the Baronetage of England